The Federal budget 2020–2021 is the federal budget of Pakistan for the fiscal year beginning from 1 July 2020 and ending on 30 June 2021. The budget was presented in the Parliament by the Federal Minister Hammad Azhar. It is also called Corona budget as it was presented during the Corona Crisis. The government called the budget a Relief budget but major opposition parties PPP and PML-N called it People's enemy budget.

Features
The total size of the budget is  billion.

 billion for defense, billion for education (7.9 per cent from higher than the last budget),  billion were allocated for preventing coronavirus,  billion for special economic zones. No new taxes were introduced in the budget. Foreign Minister Shah Mehmood Qureshi confirmed that defence spending was not raised for the second consecutive year.

References

Budgets
Pakistani budgets
Parliament of Pakistan
2020 in Pakistani politics
2021 in Pakistani politics